Abell 1991 is a galaxy cluster in the Abell catalogue.

See also
 Abell catalogue
 List of Abell clusters

References

1991
Galaxy clusters
Abell richness class 1